Rohit Thakur may refer:

 Rohit Thakur (politician), Indian politician
 Rohit Thakur (soccer), American soccer player